English singer-songwriter Teddy Sinclair has released two studio albums, one extended play (EP), and ten singles as an artist, as well as eight as a featured artist. She began her musical career by releasing a standalone single, entitled "Don't Play Nice", under the alias of Verbalicious, with label All Around the World. Although the song reached number eleven in the United Kingdom, the label went bankrupt shortly after the song's release. In 2008, Sinclair collaborated with French recording artist M. Pokora in the song "They Talk Shit About Me", as Verse. Sinclair later changed her stage name to Natalia Cappuccini and released the extended play Wommanequin independently.

After signing a record deal with Cherrytree, an imprint of Interscope, Sinclair released her debut album as Natalia Kills, Perfectionist, in April 2011, which peaked at number 129 on the UK Albums Chart. It also debuted at number 134 on the US Billboard 200. To promote it, four singles were released, including "Mirrors", which was able to reach the top 10 in Austria and Germany. Her second record, Trouble, was released in September 2013. It debuted on the US Billboard 200 at number 70. Its release was preceded by the singles "Problem" and "Saturday Night"; the latter became a moderate hit in New Zealand, reaching the top 30 there.

Studio albums

Extended plays

Singles

As lead artist

As featured artist

Promotional singles

Guest appearances

Songwriting credits

References

Discographies of British artists
Pop music discographies